.ne is the Internet country code top-level domain (ccTLD) for Niger.

Unrelated to the .ne top-level domain, "ne" is sometimes used as a second-level domain within other country-code domains, in which registrants may register second-level domains of the form .ne.xx, where xx is the ccTLD. Two examples are Japan (.ne.jp) and South Korea. .ne domain names can be registered via certain accredited registrars.

Minecraft has also used this domain for their shortener with the redsto.ne URL.

References

External links
 IANA .ne whois information

Country code top-level domains
Communications in Niger

sv:Toppdomän#N